Joshua: Teenager vs. Superpower is a 2017 documentary about Joshua Wong, a teenager who rallies Hong Kong youth in dissent during the 2014 Hong Kong Occupy Movement when the Chinese Communist Party reneged on its promise of autonomy to the territory. At Sundance, Netflix negotiated worldwide viewing rights for the documentary. The film premiered at the 2017 Sundance Film Festival at the Park City Temple Theatre in Sundance's World Documentary Competition. The film was released on Netflix on 26 May 2017.

Awards and nominations
 World Cinema Audience Award in the 'Documentary' category at the 2017 Sundance Film Festival 
 Producers Guild of America Award (nominated)

Reception

See also 
 	
 Scholarism
 Umbrella Revolution
 Occupy Central (2011–12)
 Occupy Central with Love and Peace
 Democratic development in Hong Kong
 One Country, Two Systems principle
 Universal suffrage
 List of TV and films critical of Chinese Communist Party
 Moral and national education
 Hong Kong Federation of Students

 Joshua Wong
 Agnes Chow
 Nathan Law
 Demosisto
 Benny Tai
 Occupy movement
 civil disobedience
 Arab Spring
 1989 Tiananmen Square protests

References

External links 
 Official trailer
 
 

2017 films
Documentaries about politics
Documentary films about politics
Politics of Hong Kong
Films about activists
Sundance Film Festival award winners
Netflix original documentary films